The passenger-cargo steamer Fah-Kee (or Fah Kee) was launched in 1862 at Greenpoint, Brooklyn and operated on the United States coast until purchased in July 1863 by the Union Navy during the American Civil War. The Navy used USS Fahkee as a collier and freight supply ship assigned to assist Union Navy ships patrolling Confederate waterways.

At the end of the war she returned to mercantile service, as a mail ship to Cuba and Bermuda. In 1872 she was sold to Canadian owners, and renamed Pictou for service between that port and Quebec. In November 1873 she went missing and was believed lost by fire.

Construction and commercial service 
Fah Kee or Fah-Kee, designed to carry both cargo and passengers was built of white oak in 1862 by the New York shipbuilder Edward F. Williams at his yard at Greenpoint, Brooklyn. The ship was powered by a 300hp steam engine with a single vertical cylinder of 42 inches diameter and 42 inches stroke, made by Pusey and Jones of Wilmington, Delaware and driving a single propeller. In addition, she carried sail, rigged as a brigantine.

The ship, intended for trading in the Far East, was launched on 24 November 1862 for Wetmore & Cryder of New York City, and named Fah Kee ("flowery flag" in Cantonese), a Chinese nickname for the USA. By then, however, she was already expected to be taken up for service with the United States Navy. Nevertheless, when Fah Kee was completed in February 1863, she was sold to the Adams Express Company and put into passenger-cargo service between the ports of New York, Beaufort, North Carolina and Port Royal, South Carolina. On 15 July the ship was purchased by the Union Navy.

Civil War service

North Atlantic Blockade
USS Fahkee was commissioned on 24 September 1863 with Acting Master F. R. Webb in command, and served the North Atlantic Blockading Squadron as a collier and freight supply ship from the time of her commissioning to the close of the war. She carried cargo from New York City, Norfolk, Virginia, and Newport News, Virginia to the fleet on the North Carolina coast, as well as providing towing services and patrolling on blockade at frequent intervals.

Operation in Battle
Fahkee first came under fire on 3 January 1864 in Lockwood's Folly Inlet near Wilmington, North Carolina, when she passed through musket and shell fire from the shore to investigate Bendigo, a blockade runner grounded and afire. Fahkee shelled the ship to further her destruction, which was completed the next day by other ships.
 
While blockading Wilmington, North Carolina, in the spring and summer of 1864, Fahkee was several times fired upon by Confederate shore batteries, and on 24 August, engaged a blockade runner. Returning to the same area after a voyage to New York and Hampton Roads, she twice fired on grounded blockade runners in December. In January 1865, she carried cargo from Norfolk to Beaufort and to the fleet operating against Fort Fisher.

South Atlantic Squadron and disposal
In April 1865, at the close of the war, Fahkee was assigned to the South Atlantic Squadron, and from Port Royal, South Carolina, provisioned ships at Charleston, South Carolina, and those cruising the coast of the Carolinas. She also cruised with the Squadron off Cuba before arriving at Philadelphia, Pennsylvania on 19 June.

Fahkee was decommissioned on 28 June 1865, and sold in Philadelphia on 10 August.

Further commercial service

After passengers and crew manned the pumps and the engine was eventually restarted, Fah Kee returned to New York on 5 August. She continued in the Cuba and Bermuda trades until mid-1869, when she was sold to J Norman Harvey, was refurbished, and continued in the mail service with Bermuda.

In March 1872, Fah Kee was sold to the Quebec and Gulf Ports Steamship Company to run between Pictou, Nova Scotia and ports on the Saint Lawrence River, and was renamed Pictou.

Loss
In November 1873 Pictou sailed from Quebec City for Pictou with calls along the way. She was last seen passing Father's Point, near Rimouski, Quebec, and it was reported that there were heavy gales in the area shortly afterwards. However, there were later reports of a fire at sea being observed from Fairfield, north-east Prince Edward Island, from the Magdalen Islands and from Pleasant Bay, Cape Breton Island on the night of 18 November. Wreckage also came ashore showing signs of burning.

Notes

References

Steamships of the United States
Steamships of Canada
Ships of the Union Navy
Ships built in Brooklyn
Steamships of the United States Navy
Tugs of the United States Navy
Colliers of the United States Navy
American Civil War patrol vessels of the United States
1862 ships
Maritime incidents in 1867
Ships lost with all hands
Maritime incidents in November 1873